Essam bin Abdulla Khalaf is a Bahraini politician. As the Head of the construction arm of Bahrain's Government, he is the current Minister of Works, Municipalities and Urban Planning. He was previously the Minister of Works, but then the two ministries were joined and he was appointed to hold both.

References

Living people
Bahraini politicians
Government ministers of Bahrain
Place of birth missing (living people)
Year of birth missing (living people)